Holyně is a small village and cadastral area (katastrální území) in Prague. It is located in the western part of the city.  As of 2011, there were 451 inhabitants living in Holyně.

It is a part of municipal district (městská část) of Praha-Slivenec.

Neighboring cadastral areas 

 Řeporyje
 Stodůlky
 Jinonice
 Hlubočepy
 Slivenec

Gallery

References 

Districts of Prague